Dicerogastra chersotoides is a species of moth of the family Noctuidae. It is found in Israel, Jordan, Saudi Arabia and Oman.

Adults are on wing from September to November in semi-arid areas and from June to July in temperate regions. There are possibly two generations per year.

External links
 Hadeninae of Israel

Hadeninae
Moths of the Middle East
Moths described in 1956